Graymont is an unincorporated community in Livingston County, Illinois, United States. Graymont has a post office with ZIP code 61743.

Graymont Grade School fielded a number of very good boys junior high basketball teams in the late 1980s.  Under the direction of head coach Tom Meling, the Warriors won Arrow Conference titles in 1987–88, 1988–89 and 1989–90.  The 1988-89 team was the greatest in school history.  Despite an eighth grade class of six students, the Warriors finished as Livingston County Runners-Up, Arrow Conference Champions, 1A Regional Champions, 1A Sectional Champions and they advanced to the Elite Eight in State.  The starting five on that team comprised Mike Cushing, Matt DeWald, Roger Bedeker, Seth Sarakaitis and Wade Ahrens.  The Elite Eight banner still resides in the cafeteria/gym at the school.

1904 brought the Farmers Elevator Company of Graymont, now known as the Graymont co-op association. The original structures no longer exist, but the company is still operation and has expanded to become one of the largest in Livingston County, IL. The State bank of Graymont began operations in 1913 and has since expanded to three locations. The Chenoa location was acquired in 1997, with the Pontiac branch being purchased the following year, while delaying the opening until 1999.

References

Unincorporated communities in Livingston County, Illinois
Unincorporated communities in Illinois